Fantozzi is a 1975 Italian satirical cult film.

Fantozzi may also refer to:

 Augusto Fantozzi (1940–2019), Italian lawyer, tax expert, academic, businessman and politician
 Ugo Fantozzi, a fictional character appearing in Italian literature and film, created by Paolo Villaggio
 Fantozzi - Il ritorno, a 1996 Italian comedy film
 Fantozzi 2000 – La clonazione, a 1999 Italian comedy film
 Fantozzi alla riscossa, a 1990 Italian comedy film
 Fantozzi contro tutti, a 1980 Italian comedy film
 Fantozzi in paradiso, a 1993 Italian comedy film
 Fantozzi subisce ancora, a 1983 Italian comedy film
 Fantozzi va in pensione, a 1988 Italian comedy film
 Il secondo tragico Fantozzi, a 1976 Italian comedy film
 PalaFantozzi, an indoor sporting arena in Capo d'Orlando, Italy
 

Surnames of Italian origin